The 2003 Davis Cup was the 92nd edition of the most important tournament between nations in men's tennis. A total of 135 nations participated in the tournament.  In the final, Australia defeated Spain at Rod Laver Arena in Melbourne, Australia, on 28–30 November, giving Australia their 28th title.

World Group

Draw

First round losers compete in play-off ties with Zonal Group I Qualifiers.

Final

World Group play-offs

Date: 19–21 September

Americas Zone

Group I
Participating Teams
  — relegated to Group II in 2004
  — advanced to World Group Qualifying Round
 
  — advanced to World Group Qualifying Round

Group II
Participating Teams
  — relegated to Group III in 2004
 
 
 
 
  — relegated to Group III in 2004
  — promoted to Group I in 2004

Group III
Participating Teams
 
 
  — relegated to Group IV in 2004
 
  — promoted to Group II in 2004
  — promoted to Group II in 2004
  — relegated to Group IV in 2004

Group IV
Participating Teams
 
 
 
  Eastern Caribbean
  — promoted to Group III in 2004
  — promoted to Group III in 2004

Asia/Oceania Zone

Group I
Participating Teams
  — advanced to World Group Qualifying Round
 
 
 
 
  — relegated to Group II in 2004
  — advanced to World Group Qualifying Round

Group II
Participating Teams
 
  — promoted to Group I in 2004
 
 
  — relegated to Group III in 2004
 
 
  — relegated to Group III in 2004

Group III
Participating Teams
 
  — promoted to Group II in 2004
  — relegated to Group IV in 2004
  — promoted to Group II in 2004
  Pacific Oceania
 
 
  — relegated to Group IV in 2004

Group IV
Participating Teams
 
 
 
  — promoted to Group III in 2004
 
 
 
  — promoted to Group III in 2004

Europe/Africa Zone

Group I
Participating Teams
  — advanced to World Group Qualifying Round
  — advanced to World Group Qualifying Round
 
 
  — relegated to Group II in 2004
 
  — advanced to World Group Qualifying Round
  — relegated to Group II in 2004
  — advanced to World Group Qualifying Round

Group II
Participating Teams
  — relegated to Group III in 2004
 
  — relegated to Group III in 2004
 
 
  — relegated to Group III in 2004
  — promoted to Group I in 2004
 
  — relegated to Group III in 2004
 
 
 
  — promoted to Group I in 2004

Group III

Venue I
Participating Teams
  — promoted to Group II in 2004
  — relegated to Group IV in 2004
  — relegated to Group IV in 2004
 
  — promoted to Group II in 2004

Venue II
Participating Teams
 
  — relegated to Group IV in 2004
 
  — promoted to Group II in 2004
  — promoted to Group II in 2004
 
  — relegated to Group IV in 2004

Group IV

Venue I
Participating Teams
  — promoted to Group III in 2004
  — promoted to Group III in 2004

Venue II
Participating Teams
  — promoted to Group III in 2004
 
 
 
 
 
 
 
  — promoted to Group III in 2004

References

 
Davis Cup
Davis Cups by year